Robert George Vincent (born 23 November 1962) is an English former professional footballer who played as a forward for Sunderland.

References

1962 births
Living people
Footballers from Newcastle upon Tyne
English footballers
Association football forwards
Sunderland A.F.C. players
Leyton Orient F.C. players
Whitley Bay F.C. players
Barrow A.F.C. players
English Football League players